Lothar Kurbjuweit (born 6 November 1950 in Riesa) is a former German footballer and football manager.

Career
Kurbjuweit played for Stahl Riesa (1965–1970) and FC Carl Zeiss Jena (1970–1983).

International career
On the national level he played for East Germany national team (66 matches/four goals), and was a participant at the 1974 FIFA World Cup.

Coaching career
He later began coaching and led several teams, including FC Carl Zeiss Jena, Rot-Weiss Erfurt and VfB Pößneck. Kurbjuweit was from 1996 between 1999 the club Chairman of FC Carl Zeiss Jena. On 22 April 2010 he signed a contract as Director of Sport with his former club FC Carl Zeiss Jena.

Personal life
Kurbjuweit is married with the former long jumper Birgit Grimm and has a son with her Tobias who is a professional footballer. In the year 1992 he was named new business executive of Honda Präsent in Jena-Göschwitz and worked for the Carcenter between 2006.

References

1950 births
Living people
German footballers
East German footballers
1974 FIFA World Cup players
Footballers at the 1972 Summer Olympics
Footballers at the 1976 Summer Olympics
Olympic footballers of East Germany
Olympic gold medalists for East Germany
Olympic bronze medalists for East Germany
German football managers
FC Carl Zeiss Jena players
FC Carl Zeiss Jena managers
Hallescher FC players
East Germany international footballers
Olympic medalists in football
FC Rot-Weiß Erfurt managers
DDR-Oberliga players
Medalists at the 1976 Summer Olympics
Medalists at the 1972 Summer Olympics
3. Liga managers
Association football defenders
People from Riesa
Footballers from Saxony
People from Bezirk Dresden